Roberto Pinheiro da Silva (born January 9, 1983 in Parnamirim) is a Brazilian cyclist, who is currently suspended from the sport, following irregularities with his biological passport.

Major results

2005
 9th Copa América de Ciclismo
2007
 2nd Road race, National Road Championships
 7th Overall Volta do Paraná
 10th Prova Ciclística 9 de Julho
2008
 7th Prova Ciclística 9 de Julho
2009
 4th Copa América de Ciclismo
2010
 Vuelta del Uruguay
1st Stages 5 & 9
 Volta Ciclística Internacional do Rio Grande do Sul
1st Stages 4 & 5
 5th Overall Giro do Interior de São Paulo
2011
 1st Prova Ciclística 9 de Julho
 Tour do Brasil
1st  Points classification
1st Stages 4, 6 & 8
 1st Stage 4 Volta Ciclística Internacional do Rio Grande do Sul
 2nd Copa América de Ciclismo
2012
 1st Stage 5 Tour do Rio
 2nd Copa América de Ciclismo
2013
 4th Copa América de Ciclismo
2014
 2nd Road race, National Road Championships
2015
 Volta Ciclística Internacional do Rio Grande do Sul
1st Points classification
1st Stage 1
2016
3rd Road race, National Road Championships
2017
 1st Stage 3b (TTT) Vuelta del Uruguay
2018
 1st Stage 2a (TTT) Vuelta del Uruguay

References

External links

1983 births
Living people
Brazilian male cyclists
Brazilian road racing cyclists